The 2005 US Open men's singles qualifying was the qualifying competition for the 2005 US Open men's singles. Sixteen players qualified for the main draw.

Seeds

Qualifiers

Lucky loser

Qualifying draw

First qualifier

Second qualifier

Third qualifier

Fourth qualifier

Fifth qualifier

Sixth qualifier

Seventh qualifier

Eighth qualifier

Ninth qualifier

Tenth qualifier

Eleventh qualifier

Twelfth qualifier

Thirteenth qualifier

Fourteenth qualifier

Fifteenth qualifier

Sixteenth qualifier

References
Results
2005 US Open – Men's draws and results at the International Tennis Federation

Men's Qualifying Singles
US Open (tennis) by year – Qualifying